Kelvin Trent Tucker (born December 20, 1959) is an American retired professional basketball player who played eleven seasons in the National Basketball Association (NBA).

A  shooting guard, Tucker attended the University of Minnesota from 1978 to 1982, leading them to a Big Ten Conference championship in his senior year. He was then selected by the New York Knicks with the 6th overall pick of the 1982 NBA draft. One of the earliest three-point specialists, Tucker represented the Knicks in the first ever Three-point Shootout (1986), making it to the semifinals before being outpaced by Craig Hodges and eventual winner Larry Bird. Tucker would play nine seasons with the Knicks before joining the San Antonio Spurs in 1991, and after one season with the Spurs he joined the Chicago Bulls, who won the 1993 NBA Championship. He retired after that season, having tallied 6,237 career points and 1,532 career assists.

The Trent Tucker Rule

On January 15, 1990, when Tucker was with New York, with 0.1 of a second remaining in a game against the Chicago Bulls, he got off a wild three-point shot before the buzzer and made the basket. The shot counted and the Knicks won. After Bulls' coach Phil Jackson vociferously complained following the game, the NBA immediately established a rule, which states that 0.3 needs to be on the clock in order for a player to get a shot off whether they make it or not. Inside of 0.3 seconds, only a tip-in or a high lob would count.

This rule is also used in 3x3 basketball.

Post-playing career
After retiring, Tucker worked as a broadcast analyst for Minnesota Timberwolves basketball games. He currently works for KFAN radio. Tucker has also been an active philanthropist; he founded the Trent Tucker Non-Profit Organization in 1998. On April 15, 2013, Trent began his duties as Director of District Athletics for the Minneapolis, MN Public School District.

Tucker, however, resigned from his post as Director of District Athletics for the Minneapolis, MN Public School District on February 9, 2018 after "he didn’t see eye-to-eye with new district leadership."

References

External links
 NBA stats @ basketball-reference.com
 TrentTucker.org
 NBA Three-Point Shootout - All Time Results
 Hoopology

1959 births
Living people
African-American basketball players
American men's basketball players
Basketball players from Flint, Michigan
Basketball players from North Carolina
Chicago Bulls players
Minnesota Golden Gophers men's basketball players
Minnesota Timberwolves announcers
New York Knicks draft picks
New York Knicks players
People from Tarboro, North Carolina
San Antonio Spurs players
Shooting guards
21st-century African-American people
20th-century African-American sportspeople